The 2021–22 New Taipei CTBC DEA season was the franchise's 1st season, its first season in the T1 League, its 1st in New Taipei City. The DEA are coached by Lee Yi-Hua in his first year as head coach.

Draft 

 Reference：

The DEA acquired 2021 first-round draft pick from Kaohsiung Aquas in exchange for cash considerations.

Standings

Roster 

<noinclude>

Game log

Hsinchu JKO Lioneers Masters Game

Preseason

Regular season

Regular season note 
 Due to the COVID-19 pandemic in Taiwan, the T1 League declared that the game on April 2 would postpone to May 7.
 Due to the COVID-19 pandemic in Taiwan, the T1 League declared that the games at the University of Taipei Tianmu Campus Gymnasium would play behind closed doors since April 4 to 10.
 Due to the Taoyuan Leopards cannot reach the minimum player number, the T1 League declared that the game on May 7 would postpone to May 18.

Semifinals

Player Statistics 
<noinclude>

Regular season

Semifinals

 Reference：

Transactions

Trades

Free agents

Additions

Subtractions

Awards

Yearly Awards

MVP of the Month

References 

2021–22 T1 League season by team
New Taipei CTBC DEA seasons